The 1869–70 college soccer season was the fourth season of intercollegiate soccer in the United States.  While played using improvised rules resembling American football and rugby, it is also considered one of the first ever college soccer seasons. The 1869 season consisted of only two total games, both of which occurred between Rutgers University and Princeton University; The first was played on November 6 at Rutgers' campus, and the second was played on November 13 at Princeton's campus.  The games itself are also considered the first ever college football games.

Matches played
There were only two matches played between two different universities during the season, both between teams from Rutgers College (now Rutgers University) and the College of New Jersey (now Princeton University). Rutgers won the game by a score of 6–4.

In addition to being considered one of the earlier soccer games reported in the United States, these two games are considered to be the first organized American college football games to ever be played.

During the season there were other scheduled soccer matches scheduled that ended up being cancelled. A soccer game between the Virginia Military Institute and Washington & Lee University was scheduled for October 23, 1869, but the match was cancelled due to rain. There were intracollegiate matches played between student bodies at the University of Michigan, Brown University, and the College of New Jersey (now known as Princeton University).

Conference table

See also 
 The First Game
 1860s in American soccer
 1869 college football season
 1869 New Jersey vs. Rutgers football game

References

External links
 Record of 2 games played